Events from the year 1623 in Denmark.

Incumbents 

 Monarch – Christian IV

Events

Undated 

 Frederick III, then prince Frederick, becomes administrator of the Prince-Bishopric of Verden, a title which he held until being expelled by the Catholic League in 1629, and then regained from 1635 to 1645.
 Ladegården is established by Christian IV.

Births 

 28 August – Steen Ottesen Brahe, military officer and landowner (died 1677)
 28 December – Elisabeth Augusta Lindenov, daughter of king Christian IV of Denmark and Kirsten Munk (died 1677)

Undated 

 Frederik Ahlefeldt, statesman and Grand Chancellor (died 1686)
 Lucas Debes, priest and author (died 1675 in the Faroe Islands)

Deaths 

 2 January – Sivert Beck, landowner and treasurer (born 1566)

Undated 

 Mogens Pedersøn, musician and composer (born c. 1583)
 Peder Munk, ambassador and navigator (born 1534)

References 

 
1620s in Denmark
Denmark
Years of the 17th century in Denmark